Altos Mirandinos metropolitan area  or Los Teques metropolitan area   (  or Area Metropolitana de Los Teques) is a metropolitan area in Miranda, Venezuela, that includes 3 municipalities, it's part of the Greater Caracas area. It has a population of 454,929 inhabitants.

Cities
The principal cities of the area are (2013):
 Los Teques (pop. 251,872)
 San Antonio de Los Altos (pop. 83,866)
 Carrizal (pop. 58,561)
 Paracotos (pop. 18,598)
 San José de Los Altos (pop. 16,489)
 San Pedro (pop. 13,170)

Municipalities

The 3 municipalities of the area are:

Transportation

Metro
The Los Teques Metro is the most important public transportation in the area with an operating line that runs for 9.5 kilometers. The system connects the city of Los Teques with the capital of Caracas.

Timeline of line extensions

See also
 Greater Caracas
 List of metropolitan areas of Venezuela

References

External links
 Estado Miranda
 Página de la alcaldía de Los Salias.
 Página de la alcaldía de Carrizal
 Página de la alcaldía del municipio Guaicaipuro
 Página del Estado Miranda

Caracas
Geography of Miranda (state)
Metropolitan areas of Venezuela
Los Teques